Middlesex House of Correction may refer to one of several institutions:

Middlesex, England

 Tothill Fields Bridewell
 Coldbath Fields Prison, London.  Also known as the Middlesex House of Correction and Clerkenwell Gaol
 Middlesex House of Correction (Westminster, London), a former 19th century female prison, now the site of Westminster Cathedral

Middlesex, Massachusetts, United States
 Middlesex Jail and House of Correction, overseen by the Middlesex County Sheriff's Office
 South Middlesex Correctional Center, a small, minimum security/pre-release state prison for women located in Framingham, Massachusetts